Carl Harvie Probert  (born 13 September 1975 in Suva, Rewa, Fiji) is a 5-time Olympic swimmer and National Record holder from Fiji. He swam for Fiji at the 1992, 1996, 2000, 2004 and 2008 Olympics.

He also competed for Fiji at the 1998 Commonwealth Games, 2002 Commonwealth Games, 2006 Commonwealth Games and at the 2007 World Aquatics Championships.

He has been a student at the University of Sydney.

In 2008, Probert qualified to compete at the 2008 Summer Olympics in Beijing. He has not won an Olympic medal. Probert was the only Fiji Islander seeking qualification, as both Caroline Pickering and Rachel Ah Koy announced they would not taking part in the Games.

References

External links

1975 births
Living people
Fijian male swimmers
Olympic swimmers of Fiji
Swimmers at the 1992 Summer Olympics
Swimmers at the 1996 Summer Olympics
Swimmers at the 2000 Summer Olympics
Swimmers at the 2004 Summer Olympics
Swimmers at the 2008 Summer Olympics
Commonwealth Games competitors for Fiji
Swimmers at the 1998 Commonwealth Games
Swimmers at the 2002 Commonwealth Games
Swimmers at the 2006 Commonwealth Games
Sportspeople from Suva
Fijian people of British descent